S. K. Sharma (10 June 1952 – 17 April 2015) was an Indian cricket umpire. He stood in ten ODI games between 1993 and 2002.

See also
 List of One Day International cricket umpires

References

1952 births
2015 deaths
Indian One Day International cricket umpires
People from Delhi